Chechen Island (Ostrov Chechen') is a coastal island on the western shore of the Caspian Sea. It is located 20 km east of Krainovka right off the headland on the northern tip of the Agrakhan Peninsula. This island belongs to the Republic of Dagestan, a federal subject of the Russian Federation.

The sea around Chechen Island usually freezes between January and March. Adjacent islands include Lopatin Island (also known as  Lopatina), Bazar, Prygunki, Pichuzhonok and Yaichnyy Island and are collectively known as the 'Chechen Archipelago'.

History  
One of the islands first mentions was around 1500 under the name sicamatela on an Italian map. The island is named after the Chechens. According to the Russian geographer and military man, the Chechens were previously settled up to the sea. German explorer Samuel Gmelin, who visited the area up until 1774, mentions how Chechens would go fishing on the island.In 1863 the lighthouse on the island was built by English builders.

In tsarist times, the island was used as a place of exile. During the Civil War, being an important stronghold of oil shipping, it changed hands. In 1918, the British located a naval aviation base on the island, which they were going to use to bomb the ships of the Volga flotilla based in Astrakhan. In April 1920, by the forces of the Volga-Caspian military flotilla, he was finally assigned to the RSFSR.

Ecology
There are many birds on Chechen Island, especially seagulls. In very cold winters herds of Saiga tatarica find refuge in the island.

References

External links
Radio operators

Islands of Russia
Landforms of Dagestan
Seabird colonies
Islands of the Caspian Sea